Nordfriedhof is an U-Bahn station in Munich on the U6.

References

External links

Munich U-Bahn stations
Railway stations in Germany opened in 1971
1971 establishments in West Germany